United States gubernatorial elections were held in 1942, in 33 states, concurrent with the House and Senate elections, on November 3, 1942 (September 14 in Maine).

In Georgia, the governor was elected to a 4-year term for the first time, instead of a 2-year term.

Results

See also 
1942 United States elections
1942 United States Senate elections
1942 United States House of Representatives elections

References 

 
November 1942 events
United States home front during World War II